Yamato Fushimi (伏見 大和 Fushimi Yamato, born December 24, 1991) is a Japanese volleyball player. He used to play for Japan men's national volleyball team and currently plays for Wolf Dogs Nagoya in V.League Division 1.

Clubs
  Toyota City Junior High School
  Shimizu Commercial High School
  Juntendo University
  Toray Arrows (2014–2019)
  JTEKT Stings (2019–2021)
  Wolf Dogs Nagoya (2021–present)

National teams

Senior Team
 2014 World League – 19th place
 2014 Asian Games –   Silver Medal
 2018 FIVB Volleyball Men's World Championship – 17th place
 2019 FIVB Volleyball Men's World Cup – 4th place

Junior Team
 2010 Asian Junior Championship –  Gold Medal
 2011 U21 World Championship – 12th place

University Team
 2013 Summer Universiade –  Bronze Medal

References

External links
 FIVB Official profile
 V-League official profile
 Toray Arrows official profile

1991 births
Japanese men's volleyball players
Living people
People from Western Tokyo
Asian Games medalists in volleyball
Volleyball players at the 2014 Asian Games
Asian Games silver medalists for Japan
Medalists at the 2014 Asian Games
Universiade medalists in volleyball
Universiade bronze medalists for Japan
Medalists at the 2013 Summer Universiade